Conversations with the Unseen is a 2003 album by British saxophonist Soweto Kinch. The album was nominated for the 2003 Mercury Prize.

Track listing
All tracks are written by Soweto Kinch.

 "Intro" (2:10)
 "Doxology" (9:14)
 "Conversations with the Unseen" (7:34)
 "Elision" (5:56)
 "Spokes and Pedals" (6:29)
 "Intermission - Split Decision" (8:19)
 "Snakehips" (7:39)
 "Mungo's Adventure" (7:06)
 "The Flame-Thrower" (2:59)
 "Equiano's Tears" (10:01)
 "Good Nyooz" (3:21)
 "Outro" (3:23)

Personnel
 Soweto Kinch – alto saxophone, rap vocals
 Femi Temowo – guitar
 Michael Olatuja – bass
 Troy Miller – drums
 Eska Mtungwazi – vocals (tracks 1, 11, 12)
 Abram Wilson – trumpet and vocals on track 6

References

2003 albums
Soweto Kinch albums